The Advanced Technology Research Council (ATRC) is an Abu Dhabi government entity responsible for shaping advanced research and development (R&D) for technology in Abu Dhabi, the capital of the United Arab Emirates.

The current ATRC Secretary-General is Faisal Al Bannai

Organization 

ATRC has three entities that manage the council's research areas:  

 Technology Innovation Institute - This is the applied research technology pillar and global research and development institution.
 ASPIRE - This is the technology and business solutions pillar.
 VentureOne - This is the commercialization arm that facilitates the transition of prototypes from lab to market.

ATRC was established in May 2020 by former UAE President Sheikh Khalifa bin Zayed Al Nahyan. ATRC is responsible for defining policies and procedures for R&D in Abu Dhabi

Research Centers 
ATRC's Technology Innovation Institute (TII) comprises 10 dedicated research centers

 Advanced Materials Research Center (AMRC)
 Autonomous Robotics Research Center (ARRC)
 Cryptography Research Center (CRC)
 AI and Digital Science Research Center (AIDRC)
 Directed Energy Research Center (DERC)
 Quantum Research Center (QRC)
 Secure Systems Research Center (SSRC)
 Propulsion and Space Research Center (PSRC)
 Renewable and Sustainable Energy Research Center (RSERC)
 Biotechnology Research Center (BRC)

External links 

 Official Website
 https://www.tii.ae/
 https://www.tii.ae/biotech/our-research
 https://thebusinessyear.com/interviews/

References 

Research institutes in the United Arab Emirates
Research institutes established in 2020
Organisations based in Abu Dhabi
2020 establishments in the United Arab Emirates
Government-related organizations